Deh-e Eslam (also romanized as Deh-e Eslām) is a village in Marz Rural District, Chah Dadkhoda District, Qaleh Ganj County, Kerman Province, Iran. At the 2006 census, its population was 41, in 7 families.

References 

Populated places in Qaleh Ganj County